The following is a list of first official international association football matches for each (present or past) member of FIFA, played up to the end of 1939. The matches are listed chronologically.


Scotland and England 

First official international match in football history.

Wales

Ireland (Northern Ireland)

Uruguay and Argentina

First official international match played outside the British Isles.

Austria and Hungary

First official international match played in continental Europe.

Bohemia (Czech Republic)

Belgium and France

Switzerland

Netherlands

Guyana and Trinidad and Tobago

Germany

Sweden and Norway

Denmark

Italy

Chile

Finland

Luxembourg

Russia

Philippines and China

Brazil

United States

Japan

Paraguay

Spain

Czechoslovakia and Yugoslavia

Egypt

Estonia

Suriname

Costa Rica and El Salvador

Guatemala and Honduras

Poland

Portugal

Romania

New Zealand and Australia

Latvia

Mexico

Lithuania

Turkey

Aruba and Curaçao

Bulgaria

Republic of Ireland

Canada

South Africa

Soviet Union

Haiti and Jamaica

Kenya and Uganda

Bolivia

Peru

Tunisia

Greece

Nicaragua

Cuba

Barbados

Palestine, British Mandate

Indonesia

Panama

Colombia

Venezuela

Ecuador

India

Zimbabwe

Slovakia

See also
List of first association football internationals per country: 1940–1962
List of first association football internationals per country: since 1962

Notes
A.A match between Uruguay and Argentina had been organized on 16 May 1901. Uruguay's team (and the match itself) was organized by Uruguayan club Albion and reinforced with players from rival club Nacional. The match ended 2–3 in favor of the Argentines. However, since clubs are not allowed to organize official international matches, the match is not considered official.
B.Some sources credit the own goal to Peet Stol.
C. China were represented by club side South China A.A.; this match is not considered an official match for China.
D. Japan were represented by a team from Tokyo Higher Normal School;  this match is considered an official match for Japan.
E. China were represented by club side South China A.A.; this match is not considered an official match for China.
F. Canadian representative sides played against the United States in 1885–86 and again in 1904; these are not considered to be official internationals. See the Canada International soccer team article for  a detailed explanation.
G.Some sources credit the own goal to Roberto Figueroa of Uruguay.

References

External links
Index of European national team matches up to the end of 1989
The RSSSF Archive - International Country Results
The Association of Football Statisticians: National football team sites
World Football Elo Ratings

1872-1940